Thomas Gore (c. 1694–1777)  of Dunstan Park, Berkshire, was a British politician who sat in the House of Commons between 1722 and 1768.

Early life
Gore was the third son of Sir William Gore Lord Mayor of London and his wife, Elizabeth Hampton. He was admitted at Inner Temple in 1711, and matriculated at Christ Church, Oxford on 4 June 1714, aged 19. He married Mary Humfreys, twice-widowed daughter of Sir William Humfreys, 1st Baronet of London on 15 September 1748. Her former husbands were William Ball Waring, and  John Honywood.

Career
Gore stood for Parliament at  Cricklade at a by-election in 1721 when he was unsuccessful, but was returned as Tory Member of Parliament for Cricklade on the interest of his elder brother, William, at the  1722 general election.  He lost his seat at Cricklade, being defeated at the  1727 general election and was out of Parliament for several years.

Gore was returned at Amersham on 17 February 1735, on the Drake interest. He spoke on the gin bill in 1736 and on the quartering of troops in 1741. He was among the Tories who voted against the motion for Walpole's removal in February 1741. At the 1741 general election, he was returned again for Amersham. He continued in opposition, signing the opposition whip of November 1743, but went over to the Administration at the end of 1744 as one of Lord Gower's followers. He spoke in favour of the vote of credit in March 1745 and supported the address of thanks on the Hessians on 3 December. In 1746 he was rewarded with a place as Muster-master general which he held for the rest of his life, but at the consequent by-election in February 1746, his Amersham seat was taken by William Drake, However, the government provided him with a seat at Portsmouth where he was returned on 3 March. 1746. After taking office, Gore supported every Administration in turn. He was re-elected for Portsmouth at the 1747 general election and also at Bedford on the interest of the  Duke of Bedford. He chose to sit for Bedford.
 
Gore was returned again for Cricklade at the 1754 general election. He is not recorded as speaking in the House during this period. In 1761 he was mentioned as a candidate for Speaker, but Newcastle considered him to be ‘too old and infirm’.  He survived a contest at Cricklade in 1761, but retired at the general election of 1768.

Death
Gore died without issue on 17 March 1777. His brothers of John and  William Gore were also MPs.

References

1690s births
1777 deaths
Members of the Parliament of Great Britain for English constituencies
British MPs 1722–1727
British MPs 1734–1741
British MPs 1741–1747
British MPs 1747–1754
British MPs 1754–1761
British MPs 1761–1768